Daweb Constituency is an electoral constituency in the Hardap Region of Namibia. It was created in August 2013, following a recommendation of the Fourth Delimitation Commission of Namibia, and in preparation of the 2014 general election. Daweb constituency was formed from the western part of Gibeon Constituency.

The administrative centre of Daweb Constituency is the village of Maltahöhe.  the constituency had 3,297 registered voters.

Politics
In the 2015 regional elections Herculus Jantze of Swapo won the constituency with 853 votes, followed by the independent candidate Adam Johannes Baisako (199 votes), Paul Lucas Simon of the Democratic Party of Namibia (DPN, 108 votes) and Anna Lukas of the Democratic Turnhalle Alliance (DTA, 80 votes). The 2020 regional election was won by Nicodemus Jesajas Motinga of the Landless People's Movement (LPM, a new party registered in 2018). He obtained 963 votes. The sitting councillor Jantze (SWAPO) came second with 628 votes.

See also
 Administrative divisions of Namibia

References

Constituencies of Hardap Region
States and territories established in 2013
2013 establishments in Namibia